RRV may refer to:

 Basque Radical Rock - a musical genre originating in the Basque Country
 Rapid response vehicle (disambiguation) - multiple types of vehicle used by emergency services
 Resident Return Visa - types of visa issued by Australia, New Zealand and the United States
 Reweighted range voting - a type of proportional voting system
 Ridge Racer V - an 2000 arcade video game
 Rock Rendez-Vous - a nightclub in Lisbon, Portugal
 Road–rail vehicle (or rail-road vehicle) - a vehicle capable of travelling on roads or railways
 Rose rosette emaravirus - a negative sense RNA virus that infects roses
 Ross River virus - a species of RNA virus native to Australia
 Royal Rifle Volunteers - a former regiment of the British Army